MacDonald Parke (1891 – 1960) was a Canadian film and television actor. He frequently portrayed American characters in British films such as No Orchids for Miss Blandish.

Filmography

References

Bibliography
 Michael F. Keaney. British Film Noir Guide. McFarland, 2008.

External links

1891 births
1960 deaths
People from Cornwall, Ontario
British male film actors
British male television actors
Canadian male film actors
Canadian male television actors
Canadian emigrants to the United Kingdom